Najm-e Divan (also Romanized as Najm-e Dīvān; also known as Baḩrīyeh (Persian: بحريه) and Baḩrīyeh-ye Najm-e Dīvān) is a village in Jazireh-ye Minu Rural District, Minu District, Khorramshahr County, Khuzestan Province, Iran. At the 2006 census, its population was 12, in 4 families.

References 

Populated places in Khorramshahr County